The 1909 Giro d'Italia was the inaugural edition of the Giro d'Italia, one of cycling's Grand Tours. The Giro began in Milan on 13 May, and Stage 5 occurred on 23 May with a stage from Rome. The race finished in Milan on 30 May.

Stage 5
23 May 1909 — Rome to Florence,

Stage 6
25 May 1909 — Florence to Genoa,

Stage 7
27 May 1909 — Genoa to Turin,

Stage 8
30 May 1909 — Turin to Milan,

References

1909 Giro d'Italia
Giro d'Italia stages